Brands Hill is a village in Berkshire, England. It is just on the outskirts of Colnbrook on the Bath Rd adjacent to the Langley junction of the M4 motorway. It has grown from a few houses and has never been a historical village. There are a few shops, including an M&S/BP petrol station. The former Plough Pub, which was a landmark on the bus routes from Hounslow to Slough, was demolished to make way for a hotel, The Holiday Inn, a few years ago. Many of the inhabitants work at Heathrow Airport, and the Royal Mail Depot.

The area is significant for its connecting through road, the Colnbrook bypass, which runs through the heart of Brands Hill, linking the M4, and Heathrow airport.

Recreation is offered by way of a local public House, the Queens Arms on London Road, the bar in the Holiday Inn Express, Tratts Pizza next door to the hotel and the Brands Hill park. The park offers child's play swings, and a permanent grassed football pitch.

Due to the proximity to London Heathrow Terminal 5, the small village offers a few B&Bs, The Airport Guest House, and Gibtel, both on the Brands Hill roundabout.

Villages in Berkshire